This is a timeline documenting events of Jazz in the year 1978.

Events

March
 17 – The 5th Vossajazz started in Voss, Norway (March 17–19).

May
 12 – The 7th Moers Festival started in Moers, Germany (May 12–15).
 24 – The 6th Nattjazz started in Bergen, Norway (May 24 – June 7).

July
 1 – The 25th Newport Jazz Festival started in Newport, Rhode Island (July 1–3).
 7 – The 12th Montreux Jazz Festival started in Montreux, Switzerland (July 7–23).
 14 – The 3rd North Sea Jazz Festival started in The Hague, Netherlands (July 14–16).
 28 – The very first Jazz in Marciac started in Marciac, France (July 28 – August 17).

September
 15 – The 21st Monterey Jazz Festival started in Monterey, California (September 15 – 17).

Album releases

Chick Corea: The Mad Hatter
Chick Corea: Secret Agent
Chick Corea: Friends
Air: Open Air Suit
Herb Alpert and Hugh Masekela: Herb Alpert / Hugh Masekela
Herb Alpert and Hugh Masekela: Main Event Live
Fred Anderson: Another Place
Art Ensemble of Chicago: Nice Guys
Kenny Barron: Innocence
Carla Bley: Musique Mecanique
Arthur Blythe: Bush Baby
Arthur Blythe: Lenox Avenue Breakdown
Lester Bowie: African Children
Anthony Braxton: For Four Orchestras
Andrew Cyrille: Metamusicians' Stomp
Anthony Davis: Of Blues and Dream
Al Di Meola: Casino
Joe Farrell: Night Dancing
Michael Franks: Burchfield Nines
Chico Freeman: The Outside Within
Ganelin Trio: Concerto Grosso
Egberto Gismondi: Solo 
Guenter Hampel: Freedom Of The Universe
Guenter Hampel: Oasis
Gerry Hemingway: Kwambe
Ernie Krivda: The Alchemist
Leroy Jenkins: The Legend of Ai Glatson
Quincy Jones: Sounds...and Stuff Like That!!
John Klemmer: Arabesque
Oliver Lake: Life Dance of Is
George Lewis: The Imaginary Suite
David Liebman: Pendulum
Chuck Mangione: Feels So Good
John McLaughlin: Electric Guitarist
Misha Mengelberg: Pech Onderweg
Pat Metheny: Pat Metheny Group
Roscoe Mitchell: LRG-Maze-S II Examples
John Oswald: Improvised
Evan Parker: Monoceros
Marvin Peterson: The Light
Jean-Luc Ponty: Cosmic Messenger
Don Pullen: Warriors
Dewey Redman: Soundsigns
Sam Rivers: Waves
Max Roach & Anthony Braxton: Birth and Rebirth
Rova Saxophone Quartet: Cinema Rovate
Leo Smith: Mass on the World
Peter Sprague: Dance of the Universe
Spyro Gyra:  Spyro Gyra
Sun Ra: Lanquidity
Cecil Taylor: 3 Phasis
Cecil Taylor: Cecil Taylor Unit
Ralph Towner: Batik
James Blood Ulmer: Tales of Captain Black
Weather Report: Mr. Gone
Paul Winter: Common Ground
World Saxophone Quartet: Steppin' with the World Saxophone Quartet

Deaths

 January
 23 – Terry Kath, American guitarist and vocalist (unintentional self-inflicted gunshot), Chicago (born 1946).
 31 – Gregory Herbert, American saxophonist and flautist, Blood, Sweat & Tears (born 1947).

 February
 26
 Frances Wayne, American vocalist (born 1924).
 Alix Combelle, French tenor saxophonist, clarinetist, and bandleader (born 1912).

 March
 4 – Joe Marsala, Italian-American clarinetist and songwriter (born 1907).
 21 – Louis Cottrell Jr., American clarinetist and tenor saxophonist (born 1911).
 25 – Richard Plunket Greene, English musician and author, Bright Young Things (born 1901).
 30 – Larry Young, American organist and occasional pianist (born 1940).

 April
 3 – Ray Noble, English bandleader, composer, arranger, radio comedian, and actor (born 1903).

 May
 19 – Teddy Hill, American big band leader and multi-instrumentalist (born 1909).
 28
 Marlowe Morris, American jazz pianist and organist (born 1915).
 Money Johnson, American jazz trumpeter (born 1918).

 June
 Bud Brisbois, American trumpeter (born 1937).

 July
 4 – Arne Hülphers, Swedish pianist and bandleader (born 1904).
 14 – Lennie Hastings, English drummer (born 1927).
 20 – Teddy Bunn, American guitarist, Spirits of Rhythm (born 1909).

 August
 14 – Joe Venuti, Italian-American jazz violinist (born 1903).
 15 – Irene Kral, American jazz singer (born 1932).
 24 – Louis Prima, Italian-American singer, songwriter, bandleader, and trumpeter (born 1910).

 September
 9 – Kaoru Abe, Japanese avant-garde alto saxophonist (born 1949).
 30 – Beryl Booker, American pianist (born 1922).

 November
 16 – Jimmy Nottingham, American jazz trumpeter (born 1925).
 18 – Lennie Tristano, American pianist, composer, and arranger (born 1919).
 26 – Frank Rosolino, American trombonist (born 1926).

 December
 17 – Don Ellis, American big-bandleader, trumpeter, composer, arranger, and film composer (born 1934).
 29 – Happy Caldwell, American clarinetist and tenor saxophonist (born 1903).

 Unknown date
 Bill Jennings, American guitarist and composer (born 1919).

Births

 January
 3 – Susana Santos Silva, Portuguese trumpeter, flugelhornist, and flautist.
 9 – China Moses, American singer.
 10
 Kekko Fornarelli, Italian pianist and composer.
 Soweto Kinch, British saxophonist.

 February
 9 – Clarice Assad, Brazilian-American composer, pianist, and singer.
 12 – Masayuki Hiizumi, Japanese keyboardist and producer.
 14 – Cem Tuncer, Turkish guitarist, composer, arranger, and producer.

 March
 5 – Søren Kjærgaard, Danish pianist, composer, and bandleader.
 18 – Videlina Mircheva, Bulgarian singer and songwriter.
 24 – Andrew McCormack, British pianist.

 April
 6 – Robert Glasper, American pianist and record producer.
 11 – Jakob Bro, Danish guitarist.
 15 – Susanne Alt, Dutch saxophonist and composer.

 May
 7 – Antal Pusztai, Hungarian guitarist.
 10 – Nils Janson, Swedish composer and trumpeter.
 25 – Michael Wollny, German pianist.
 29 – Sean Jones, American trumpeter and composer.

 June
 10 – Jukka Eskola, Finnish trumpeter and flugelhornist.

 August
 6 – Andreas Öberg, Swedish guitarist, songwriter, and music producer.
 12 – Chris Jennings, Canadian upright bassist, composer, arranger, and educator.
 27 – Susy Kane, English actress, comedy writer and musician.
 31
 Morten Qvenild, Norwegian jazz pianist, band leader and producer, Susanna and the Magical Orchestra.
 Tineke Postma, Dutch saxophonist.

 June
 17 – Esben Selvig, Norwegian rapper and singer.

 September
 2 – Jonas Kullhammar, Swedish composer and saxophonist.
 16
 Ane Carmen Roggen, Norwegian singer, conductor, and arranger, Pitsj.
 Ida Roggen, Norwegian singer, Pitsj.
 23 – Valtteri Laurell Pöyhönen, Finnish guitarist, pianist, composer, bandleader and producer.
 29 – Luca Gianquitto, Italian guitarist and composer.

 October
 5 – Steinar Nickelsen, Norwegian Hammond organist, pianist, and composer.
 8 – Mike Moreno, American guitarist and composer.
 12 – Børge-Are Halvorsen, Norwegian saxophonist and flautist.
 16 – Eva Kruse, German upright bassist and composer.

 November
 1 – Rozina Pátkai, Hungarian singer, songwriter, and visual artist.
 3 – Jonas Howden Sjøvaag, Norwegian jazz drummer.
 5 – Marita Røstad, Norwegian singer-songwriter.
 9 – Even Ormestad, Norwegian bass guitarist and music producer, Jaga Jazzist.
 19
 Matt Dusk, Canadian vocalist.
 Janek Gwizdala, English bassist.

 December
 12 – Lage Lund, Norwegian guitarist.
 28 – Terrace Martin, American saxophonist and producer.
 30
 Daniel Heløy Davidsen, Danish-Norwegian guitarist.
 Julie Dahle Aagård, Norwegian vocalist, composer, and band leader.

 Unknown date
 Marc Demuth, Luxembourgian upright bassist, bass guitarist, and composer.
 Mikkel Ploug, Danish guitarist and composer.
 Niels Klein, German saxophonist, clarinetist, and composer.
 Robi Botos, Hungarian-Canadian pianist and composer.

See also

 1970s in jazz
 List of years in jazz
 1978 in music

References

External links 
 History Of Jazz Timeline: 1978 at All About Jazz

Jazz
Jazz by year